CJK Unified Ideographs Extension G is a Unicode block containing rare and historic CJK Unified Ideographs for Chinese, Japanese, Korean, and Vietnamese. It is the first block to be allocated to the Tertiary Ideographic Plane.

The exotic characters Biáng and Taito are present in this block.

Block

History
The following Unicode-related documents record the purpose and process of defining specific characters in the CJK Unified Ideographs Extension G block:

References 

Unicode blocks